Sibusiso is a given name. Notable people with the name include:

Sibusiso Bengu (born 1934), South African politician
Barnabas Sibusiso Dlamini (born 1942), the Prime Minister of Swaziland
Sibusiso Dlamini (born 1980), Swazi football striker
Sibusiso Duma (born 1984), South African serial killer
Sibusiso Hadebe (born 1987), South African professional footballer
Sibusiso Khumalo (footballer, born 1989), South African footballer
Sibusiso Khumalo (footballer, born 1991), footballer
Sibusiso Ndebele (born 1948), former Minister of Correctional Services serving from 2012 to 2014
Sibusiso Ntuli (born 1988), South African football midfielder
Sibusiso Nyembezi (1919–2000), South African writer known as a Zulu novelist, poet, scholar, teacher and editor
Sibusiso Papa (1987–2014), South African professional footballer
Sibusiso Sithole, South African rugby union player
Sibusiso Vilakazi (born 1989), South African football player
Sibusiso Vilane (born 1970), South African adventurer and motivational speaker
Sibusiso Zuma (born 1975), South African professional football player